In geometry, the Hesse configuration, introduced by Colin Maclaurin and studied by ,  is a configuration of 9 points and 12 lines with three points per line and four lines through each point. It can be realized in the complex projective plane as the set of inflection points of an elliptic curve, but it has no realization in the Euclidean plane.

Description
The Hesse configuration has the same incidence relations as the lines and points of the affine plane over the field of 3 elements. That is, the points of the Hesse configuration may be identified with ordered pairs of numbers modulo 3, and the lines of the configuration may correspondingly be identified with the triples of points  satisfying a linear equation . Alternatively, the points of the configuration may be identified by the squares of a tic-tac-toe board, and the lines may be identified with the lines and broken diagonals of the board.

Each point belongs to four lines: in the tic tac toe interpretation of the configuration, one line is horizontal, one vertical, and two are diagonals or broken diagonals. Each line contains three points. In the language of configurations the Hesse configuration has the notation 94123, meaning that there are 9 points, 4 lines per point, 12 lines, and 3 points per line.

The Hesse configuration has 216 symmetries (its automorphism group has order 216). The group of its symmetries is known as the Hessian group.

Related configurations
Removing any one point and its four incident lines from the Hesse configuration produces another configuration of type 8383, the Möbius–Kantor configuration.

In the Hesse configuration, the 12 lines may be grouped into four triples of parallel (non-intersecting) lines. Removing from the Hesse configuration the three lines belonging to a single triple produces a configuration of type 9393, the Pappus configuration.

The Hesse configuration may in turn be augmented by adding four points, one for each triple of non-intersecting lines, and one line containing the four new points, to form a configuration of type 134134, the set of points and lines of the projective plane over the three-element field.

Realizability
The Hesse configuration can be realized in the complex projective plane  as the 9 inflection points of an elliptic curve and the 12 lines through triples of inflection points. If a given set of nine points in the complex plane is the set of inflections of an elliptic curve C, it is also the set of inflections of every curve in a pencil of curves generated by C and by the Hessian curve of C, the Hesse pencil.

The Hessian polyhedron is a representation of the Hesse configuration in the complex plane.

The Hesse configuration shares with the Möbius–Kantor configuration the property of having a complex realization but not being realizable by points and straight lines in the Euclidean plane. In the Hesse configuration, every two points are connected by a line of the configuration (the defining property of the Sylvester–Gallai configurations) and therefore every line through two of its points contains a third point. But in the Euclidean plane, every finite set of points  is either collinear, or includes a pair of points whose line does not contain any other points of the set; this is the Sylvester–Gallai theorem. Because the Hesse configuration disobeys the Sylvester–Gallai theorem, it has no Euclidean realization. This example also shows that the Sylvester–Gallai theorem cannot be generalized to the complex projective plane. However, in complex spaces, the Hesse configuration and all Sylvester–Gallai configurations must lie within a two-dimensional flat subspace.

References

Configurations (geometry)
Elliptic curves